is a mathematician, currently a professor at Waseda University. His research centers on set theory and its applications, particularly in algebraic topology. He has done a great deal of work on the fundamental group of the Hawaiian earring and related subjects.

External links
 Eda's home page at Waseda University

Living people
21st-century Japanese mathematicians
Set theorists
Topologists
Academic staff of Waseda University
Year of birth missing (living people)